Vasanta College for Women, also known as Vasanta College, is a women's college in Rajghat, Varanasi (India), admitted to the privileges of the Benaras Hindu University. It was established in 1913 by Dr. Annie Besant.

History
Vasanta College was founded by Annie Besant in 1913. The college initially was situated in the compound of the Theosophical Society at Kamachha, Bhelupura, Varanasi. In 1954, Jiddu Krishnamurti, foster son of Dr. Annie Besant established the college in Rajghat and in the same year, Vasant Kanya Mahavidyalaya commenced operations in the older facility of Vasanta College.

Vasanta College is situated in a campus of 300 acres and overlooks the river Ganges.

See also

Benaras Hindu University
List of educational institutions in Varanasi

References

Colleges in India
Women's universities and colleges in Uttar Pradesh
Universities and colleges in Varanasi
Banaras Hindu University
Educational institutions established in 1913
1913 establishments in India